Another Shade of Blue is an album by saxophonist Lee Konitz.

Background 
Konitz recorded Alone Together for Blue Note in 1996, with pianist Brad Mehldau and bassist Charlie Haden. Exactly a year later, the same band recorded Another Shade of Blue.

Music and recording 
The album was recorded at the Jazz Bakery in Los Angeles, in December 1997.

Reception 

The JazzTimes reviewer commented that the tracks were too long and taken at a very slow tempo. The Penguin Guide to Jazz praised the renditions of "Body and Soul" and "What's New?", but preferred the earlier Alone Together recording.

Track listing 
"Another Shade of Blue" (Lee Konitz) – 10:50
"Everything Happens to Me" (Tom Adair, Matt Dennis) – 12:15 	
"What's New?" (Johnny Burke, Bob Haggart) – 15:49 		
"Body and Soul" (Frank Eyton, Johnny Green, Edward Heyman, Robert Sour) – 17:29
"All of Us" (Charlie Haden, Konitz, Brad Mehldau) – 11:27

Personnel 
 Lee Konitz – alto sax
 Brad Mehldau – piano
 Charlie Haden – bass

References 

Blue Note Records live albums
Lee Konitz live albums
1997 live albums